North Passage Point Park is a  park located in the Northlake neighborhood of Seattle, Washington, directly underneath the Ship Canal Bridge on the north side of the Lake Union/Portage Bay shoreline. It was dedicated in 1977. South Passage Point Park is directly across the water on the south shore.

External links

Seattle Department of Parks and Recreation

Parks in Seattle
1977 establishments in Washington (state)